Birdie Rocks is a group of rocks lying south of Undine Harbour between Begg Point and Saluta Rocks, off the west end of South Georgia. The name appears to be first used on a 1929 British Admiralty chart.

References
 

Rock formations of Antarctica